Maksimir Park is the oldest public park in Zagreb, Croatia. It forms part of the city's cultural heritage and is a habitat for many different plant and animal species.

History

Founded in 1787, Maksimir Park was the first large public park in South-Eastern Europe, and predates the majority of Europe's public park foundings. The park was opened in 1794 under the initiative of the man for whom it was named, Bishop Maksimilijan Vrhovac of Zagreb (1752–1827). At that time, the park was located on the outskirts of the city, although today it is surrounded by many of the city's neighborhoods. It was formerly a dense forest of hornbeams (Carpinus betulus) and oaks (Quercus robur and Q. petraea). The remainder of the original forest survives as a girdle to the park, the area in total measuring above .

Landscaping

Although the landscaping was first conceived by Bishop Vrhovac in the baroque style, in 1839, Bishop Juraj Haulik (1788–1869), and others redesigned the park. Haulik's vision was very much in line with Biedermeierist notions, and romantic neoclassicism, with elements from historicism; and in emulation of the park at the Laxenburg estate of the Habsburgs.

The process of transforming Maksimir Park involved the felling of the forest interior, the grading of hills, the excavating of great holes for lakes, the laying of paths, and construction of bridges.

Others who were instrumental in the making of the park were sculptors Anton Dominik Fernkorn (1813–1878), and Josip Kassmann (1784–1856); master gardener Franjo Serafin Korbler (1812–1866); landscape architect Michael Sebastian Riedel (1763–1850); and architect Franz Schücht.

Schücht's contributions include, among others, Paviljon Jeka (The Pavilion of Echoes), a lookout known as the Kiosk, and a house called Švicarska kuća (The Swiss House).

Design

The park has several big meadows, numerous creeks, and five lakes, and is a habitat for various plant and animal species, such as the Middle Spotted Woodpecker (Dendrocopos medius), an endangered species in Europe.

Zagreb’s Zoo also forms part of the park’s territory, located in the southern part of Maksimir Park.

In addition to the park, the name Maksimir may also refer to one of Zagreb’s neighborhoods and NK Dinamo’s stadium, both of which are adjacent to the park.

Location and access
Maksimir is located in the eastern central part of the city. 

ZET tram lines 4, 5, 7, 11 and 12 frequently connect the park to the rest of the city. A stop named Bukovačka is located at the main entrance into the park.

A less frequent bus route 226 from a nearby Svetice terminal connects to the Mirogoj cemetery and goes on to the Kaptol terminal in the old city centre.

References

External links
 

1787 establishments in the Habsburg monarchy
Parks in Croatia
Geography of Zagreb
Culture in Zagreb
Tourist attractions in Zagreb
Maksimir